The 2019–20 season was the 113th season in existence of Sevilla FC and the club's 19th consecutive season in La Liga, the top league of Spanish football. Sevilla competed in La Liga, the Copa del Rey and the UEFA Europa League, winning the latter for a record sixth time.

Kit
On 21 May 2018, Sevilla announced a new three-year kit supply contract with American sportswear giant Nike from 2018–2021.

Players

Squad

Players In

Total spending:  €176.75M

Players Out

Total income:  €123.8M

Net:  €52.95M

Pre-season and friendlies

Competitions

Overall

La Liga

League table

Results summary

Results by round

Matches
The La Liga schedule was announced on 4 July 2019.

Copa del Rey

On 29 April 2019, the assembly of the Royal Spanish Football Federation approved the new competition format, expanding the competition and changing all rounds to a single-match format until the semifinals.  All La Liga teams, except the four participants in the Supercopa de España, entered in the first round.

UEFA Europa League

During the prior season, Sevilla finished sixth in La Liga. Since the winners of the Copa del Rey, Valencia, also qualified for European competition based on league position, the spot awarded to the cup winners (Europa League group stage) was passed to the sixth-placed team.

Group stage

Knockout phase

Statistics

Squad appearances and goals

|-
! colspan=12 style=background:#dcdcdc; text-align:center|Goalkeepers

|-
! colspan=12 style=background:#dcdcdc; text-align:center|Defenders

|-
! colspan=12 style=background:#dcdcdc; text-align:center|Midfielders

|-
! colspan=12 style=background:#dcdcdc; text-align:center|Forwards

|-
! colspan=14 style=background:#dcdcdc; text-align:center|Players who made an appearance this season but left the club

|}

Goalscorers

Clean sheets

Disciplinary record

Includes all competitive matches.

Notes

References

External links

Sevilla FC seasons
Sevilla FC
Sevilla FC
UEFA Europa League-winning seasons